The Anthony family is the only three-generation dynasty in the Australian House of Representatives. All three sat in the Division of Richmond in north-eastern New South Wales.
 
Larry Anthony Sr. (Hubert Lawrence Anthony; 1897-1957), born in Warren, farmer and chairman of the Banana Growers Federation, became an MP in 1937 and a minister by 1940, and a minister again from 1949 until his sudden death in 1957.
Doug Anthony (John Douglas Anthony; 1929-2020), born in Murwillumbah, farmer, became an MP when his father died in 1957 and a minister from 1964, Deputy Prime Minister of Australia under John Gorton (1971), William McMahon (1971-1972) and Malcolm Fraser (1975–1983), before resigning in 1984.
Larry Anthony, Jr. (Lawrence James Anthony; born 1961), born in Sydney, businessman and stockbroker, was the third Anthony in Richmond, from 1996 to 2004. He was a minister from 1999 until his defeat by Justine Elliot five years later. He is now on the board of directors of the Queensland-based financial institution Indue, and the leading edge technology company uniDap Solutions. He is also the Chairman of The Duke of Edinburgh's Award for Australia.

Political families of Australia